Ravi Shankar Shukla Stadium is the main sports venue in Jabalpur, Madhya Pradesh. It is used for several events, like association football and cricket. The stadium has hosted two first-class matches in 1976 and 1981 between Madhya Pradesh and Rajasthan and between Madhya Pradesh and Uttar Pradesh.

History 

As originally planned, the stadium was to be built in Ranital. However, given the time and expense involved, the then District Council Chairman of Jabalpur City in 1956, Captain B P Tiwari decided to build a small stadium in Wright Town grounds. Due to the death of Ravishankar Shukla in 1956, Captain B P Tiwari, Shukla's close aide, decided to name the stadium and adjacent sports facilities after him. The Ravishankar Shukla stadium was established as a result of this.

First-class 

List of First-class matches played at Ravi Shankar Shukla Stadium

See also
 Stadium picture
 cricketarchive
 espncricinfo

References

Football venues in Madhya Pradesh
Multi-purpose stadiums in India
Cricket grounds in Madhya Pradesh
Sports venues in Jabalpur
Buildings and structures in Jabalpur
1976 establishments in Madhya Pradesh
Sports venues completed in 1976
20th-century architecture in India